Anne Mattocks Strieber (August 25, 1946 – August 11, 2015) was an American author, known for her thrillers An Invisible Woman (2004) and Little Town Lies (2005).

Biography 
Before becoming a writer, she was a schoolteacher. She married fellow novelist, Whitley Strieber; they have one son, Andrew.

She was the managing editor of her husband's Web site, unknowncountry.com and was also a host of the Dreamland radio show podcast presented there.

She was portrayed by Lindsay Crouse in the film adaptation of her husband's nonfiction work Communion.

Anne Strieber died on August 11, 2015.

References

External links
unknowncountry.com

1946 births
2015 deaths
21st-century American novelists
American women novelists
21st-century American women writers
20th-century American novelists
20th-century American women writers